Finland participated in the ninth Winter Paralympics in Turin, Italy. 

Finland entered seven athletes in the following sports:

Alpine skiing: 1 male, 1 female
Nordic skiing: 3 male, 2 female

The country failed to win a single medal; it was the first time it failed to do so at the Winter Paralympics. Finland had once been among the dominant countries at the Winter Paralympic Games, finishing second or third at the first three editions of the Games, and remaining in the top 10 until 2002, included.

Medalists

See also
2006 Winter Paralympics
Finland at the 2006 Winter Olympics

References

External links
Torino 2006 Paralympic Games
International Paralympic Committee
Suomen Invalidien Urheiluliitto

2006
Nations at the 2006 Winter Paralympics
Winter Paralympics